Alone Against the Wendigo, subtitled Solitaire Adventure in Canada's Wilds, is a solo adventure published by Chaosium in 1985 for the horror role-playing game  Call of Cthulhu. Written by Glen Rahman, it is the first Call of Cthulhu solo adventure published, and as part of the plot the player character anthropologist Dr. L. C. Nadelmann travels deep into the wilds of Canada, facing challenges and an encounter with the Wendigo.  Chaosium published an expanded second edition of the adventure in 2019 retitled Alone Against the Frost.

Description

Plot summary
Alone Against the Wendigo is a Call of Cthulhu adventure for a single player, with no need for a referee. The player takes on the role of Dr. L. C. Nadelmann, an anthropologist from Miskatonic University. The doctor, accompanied by a local Métis guide and three graduate students, travels deep into the wilds of Canada, seeking the mysterious North Hanninah valley. The doctor and companions will face many challenges, including an encounter with the Wendigo.

Gameplay
Blank Investigator sheets are provided. After choosing Dr. Nadelmann's gender, the player must then choose how to allocate 390 skill points, with at least 40 going towards Anthropology.

The player starts the adventure by reading the first paragraph of the adventure. All of the subsequent 654 paragraphs are individually numbered; much like the Fighting Fantasy series of adventure books published by Games Workshop, decisions made by the player, or succeeding or failing at luck, combat or skill dice rolls, will route the player to different paragraphs, providing a varying storyline depending on the choices, successes and failures the player makes.

At the end of each paragraph, the player is rewarded with a certain number of "Hanninah Mythos" ("HM") points, representing the knowledge the doctor has learned.

Victory conditions
The player can consider the game won if the doctor defeats the Wendigo, returns with all his party members alive, and is in possession of 
 a map of the Golden Ledge
 the head of the Sasquatch
 and evidence of animal and plant life thought to have been extinct

Replays
The same player can replay the adventure over again to see what different decisions and successes or failures have on the storyline. If the doctor dies, the player can restart, the only requirement being that Dr. Nadelmann's skill points must be reallocated, and the doctor will only be credited with 1/5th of the HM points that the previous doctor earned before he died. If Dr. Nadelmann survived but only scored a partial victory, the player can send the doctor out into the wilderness again with the same character sheet and full accumulated HM  points as well as renewed vigor, sanity and constitution scores.

Publication history

Chaosium originally published the horror role-playing game Call of Cthulhu in 1981. Alone Against the Wendigo, published in 1985, was the game's first solo adventure, a 68-page softcover book with a removable cardstock insert designed by Glenn Rahman, with contributions by Jeff Okamoto, and artwork by Dan Day, David Day, and Tom Sullivan. 

Alone Against the Wendigo was quickly followed by a second solo adventure, Alone Against the Dark (1985).

Twenty years after its initial publication, Alone Against the Wendigo was rewritten and updated to 7th-edition Call of Cthulhu rules by Gavin Inglis, with interior artwork by Albert Bierstadt, Quinn Dombrowski, Gnangarra, Gavin Inglis, Caleb Kimbrough, Alfred Pearson, and William Warby, and cover art by Petr Štovik. It was retitled Alone Against the Frost to avoid the cultural appropriation of "Wendigo", a significant term in some First Nations cultures.

Reception
In the April 1986 edition of White Dwarf (Issue #76), Phil Frances noted that "Wendigo is [...] written in a style likely to enhance enjoyment." But he cautioned that "The adventure is very tough, and one game can be totally different from the last (although there are certain constant elements), so this is one solo that can be played over and over again. The possibilities are not easily exhausted, and it is a real challenge trying to succeed." Frances criticized the addition of Hanninah Mythos points, pointing out "the addition of Hanninah Mythos after each paragraph can break the action up, spoiling the atmosphere." He concluded by giving it an overall rating of 8 out of 10, saying, "The solo format works well for Call of Cthulhu, and I know that another such adventure is soon to be released. With a bit of luck, it won't be the last."

In the April 1986 edition of Adventurer (Issue 1), the reviewer found the adventure very challenging, noting, "Beset with mishap, misfortune or disaster from the start, you will need skill and luck to survive this adventure. Two failed skill rolls could result in the death of the whole party by the 4th paragraph, whilst a few more failed rolls could end up with the loss of the party, and with Dr. Nadelmann discredited, imprisoned and hated. All this without so much as an encounter with a wild animal!!" The reviewer concluded with a recommendation, saying, "It can be used over again and then possibly modified to be run as a group adventure, making it worth adding to your collection of Cthulhu regalia."

Other reviews
Abyss Spring 1989 (Issue 43, p. 12)
Alarums & Excursions July 1987 (Issue 143, p. 41)
Dagon January 1986 (Issue 11)
ZauberZeit April 1987 (Issue 4, p. 49, in German)

References

Call of Cthulhu (role-playing game) adventures
Role-playing game supplements introduced in 1985